Anjirli (also Romanized as Anjīrlī; also known as Īndjīrlī) is a village in Qomrud Rural District, in the Central District of Qom County, Qom Province, Iran.

Description 
At the 2006 census, its population was 102, in 27 families.

References 

Populated places in Qom Province